Stéphane Michon (born 1974) is a French nordic combined skier who competed in the 1990s. He finished sixth in the 3 × 10 km team event at the 1994 Winter Olympics in Lillehammer.
Michon used to compete in regional competitions like Franco-Suisse or Transjurassienne. He competes in mountain bike (solo and tandem) and cross country (trail).

External links

1974 births
Nordic combined skiers at the 1994 Winter Olympics
French male Nordic combined skiers
Olympic Nordic combined skiers of France
Living people
Date of birth missing (living people)